Kalyptorhynchia is a suborder of rhabdocoel flatworms. It contains almost 600 species and has a cosmopolitan distribution.

Description 
All kalyptorhynchs have an anterior muscular proboscis which is used to capture prey. The proboscis is located inside an invagination of the epidermis called the proboscis-sheath that is closed by a sphincter at the tip of the body. Another synapomorphy supporting the group is the incorporation of the axonemes within the cell body of sperm cells during spermiogenesis.

Classification 
Kalyptorhynchs are traditionally classified into two infraorders: Eukalyptorhynchia, with a cone-shaped proboscis, and Schizorhynchia, with a proboscis formed by two opposite parallel muscular sheets. However, molecular studies have shown that Eukalyptorhynchia is not a monophyletic group and further studies are necessary to improve the knowledge about the relationships of the different kalyptorhynch clades.

References 

Rhabdocoela